Bieberstein is a German surname. Notable people with the surname include:

Adolf Marschall von Bieberstein (1842–1912), German politician
Adolph Bieberstein (1902–1981), American footballer
Arno Bieberstein (1884–1918), German swimmer
Friedrich August Marschall von Bieberstein (1768–1826) German botanist

The Marschall von Bieberstein family origins come from the region of Saxony in Eastern Germany. The current German family derives from the Bieberstein Castle near Dresden.

See also 
 Biberstein coat of arms

References

German-language surnames

de:Bieberstein